The Crow Wing Chain of Lakes is a chain of eleven shallow lakes along the Crow Wing River in Hubbard County, Minnesota, approximately  upstream from the Crow Wing's confluence with the Mississippi River. Although connected, there are a few dams between a few of the lakes that are impossible to traverse via motorboats, although they are able to be crossed in canoe.

Lakes

References

Chains of lakes
Lakes of Minnesota
Lakes of Hubbard County, Minnesota